Heteroturris sola is a species of sea snail, a marine gastropod mollusk in the family Borsoniidae.

Description

Distribution
This marine species occurs off Cebu, the Philippines.

References

 Powell, 1967. The family Turridae in the Indo-Pacific. Part 1a: The subfamily Turrinae concluded.

External links
 Heteroturris sola
  Bouchet P., Kantor Yu.I., Sysoev A. & Puillandre N. (2011) A new operational classification of the Conoidea. Journal of Molluscan Studies 77: 273–308
 
 MNHN, Paris: Heteroturris sola

sola
Gastropods described in 1967